Tana River may refer to:

Tana River (Alaska), a river in Alaska, United States
Tana River (Cuba), a river in southern Cuba
Tana River (Kenya), the longest river in Kenya
Tana River County, a county in Kenya
Tana River Primate Reserve, a protected animal reserve in Kenya
Tana River (Norway), a river on the border between Norway and Finland

See also
South of Tana River (1963), a Danish movie